Emily Ann deRiel (born November 12, 1974 in Boston, Massachusetts) is a former U.S. modern pentathlete who competed at the 2000 Summer Olympics in Sydney. She won a silver medal in the inaugural women's event, with a score of 5,310 points, just behind Great Britain's Stephanie Cook by an eight-point difference.

References

External links
 

1974 births
Living people
American female modern pentathletes
Modern pentathletes at the 2000 Summer Olympics
Olympic silver medalists for the United States in modern pentathlon
Medalists at the 2000 Summer Olympics
21st-century American women